Greif, Inc. is an American manufacturing company based in Delaware, Ohio. Originally a manufacturer of barrels, the company is now focused on producing industrial packaging and containers. In 2018, the company ranked 642 on the Fortune 1000.

History

The company was founded in Cleveland in 1877 as "Vanderwyst and Greif" by Charles Greif and his partner Albert Vanderwyst. After three brothers from the Greif family joined the company, it was renamed Greif Bros. Company, and focused on cooperage for the transportation of post-Civil War goods. In 1926, the company made its first public offering as The Greif Bros. Cooperage Corporation.

In 1951, the headquarters was moved from Cleveland to its current location in Delaware, Ohio. Under the leadership of John C. Dempsey, the company transitioned out of the cooperage industry and into industrial packaging, formally dropping the Cooperage from its name in 1969. 
By 1980, the company had approximately 100 manufacturing facilities in the United States and Canada.

In the late 1990s, and early 2000s, Greif made a significant number of purchases of packaging and industrial businesses. Most notable among these was its purchase of the industrial packaging business of Finnish company Huhtamaeki Van Leer Oyj in 2000 for $620 million, which doubled the size of the company.

On February 11, 2019, Greif completed the acquisition of Caraustar Industries, a manufacturer of recycled materials and paper products with locations in the United States and Canada. Greif purchased Caraustar for $1.8 billion.

References

External links 

 Greif Inc. History at FundingUniverse

Manufacturing companies based in Ohio
Delaware, Ohio
Companies listed on the New York Stock Exchange
Packaging companies of the United States
Manufacturing companies established in 1877
1877 establishments in Ohio